Daniel Joseph Savage (January 13, 1890 – February 1, 1931) was an American football, basketball, and baseball coach. He served as the head football coach at Saint Louis University from 1923 to 1925, compiling a record of 13–13–1 Savage was also the head basketball coach at Saint Louis from 1922 to 1926 and the school's head baseball coach from 1925 to 1926. Savage played college football at St. Ignatius College—now known as John Carroll University—in University Heights, Ohio. He died on February 1, 1931, at Mercy Hospital in Hamilton, Ohio, after suffering a skull fracture sustained in a fall down a set of stairs.

Head coaching record

Football

References

External links
 

1890 births
1931 deaths
Basketball coaches from Ohio
John Carroll Blue Streaks football players
Saint Louis Billikens athletic directors
Saint Louis Billikens baseball coaches
Saint Louis Billikens football coaches
Saint Louis Billikens men's basketball coaches
High school basketball coaches in Ohio
High school football coaches in Missouri
High school football coaches in Ohio
Sportspeople from Cleveland
St. Xavier High School (Ohio) people
Players of American football from Cleveland